David Keith Lynch (born January 20, 1946) is an American filmmaker, painter, television director, visual artist, musician, and occasional actor. Known for his surrealist films, he has developed his own unique cinematic style, known as "Lynchian"; this style is characterized by its dream imagery and meticulous sound design. The surreal and, in many cases, violent elements to his films have been said to "disturb, offend or mystify" their audiences.

Over the course of Lynch's career, he has collaborated with several individuals on multiple occasions; his films frequently feature recurring cast members and principal production roles are often filled by a small pool of collaborators. The most prolific of Lynch's frequently used actors was Jack Nance, who first worked with Lynch on 1977's Eraserhead, and would appear in many more of Lynch's productions until Nance's death in 1996. Several individuals with whom Lynch would work on multiple occasions are fellow alumni of the AFI Conservatory, including sound designer Alan Splet, cinematographer Frederick Elmes and actor Catherine E. Coulson.

Lynch has been known to allow his collaborative partners a large degree of control over their roles when working with him; Kyle MacLachlan has several times persuaded Lynch to rewrite scenes, including in 1986's Blue Velvet and the television series Twin Peaks, as he felt they were not right for his characters. The following lists include all of the cast and crew members with whom Lynch has worked on three or more separate projects.

Cast

Lynch's partnership with actress Laura Dern spans three feature films, and was later included on a list of "40 Great Actor & Director Partnerships" by the film magazine Empire. Lynch personally lobbied for Dern to win the Academy Award for Best Actress for her role in Inland Empire, sitting by a corner of Sunset Boulevard in Hollywood, California, with a cow to raise awareness of her performance. However, the campaign was unsuccessful, with Dern not receiving a nomination for the award.

Lynch has also worked with actor Kyle MacLachlan on several projects; MacLachlan has been described as an on-screen incarnation of Lynch's own persona. The pair's working relationship has also been compared to that between director François Truffaut and actor Jean-Pierre Léaud. MacLachlan has commented that he felt "unstoppable" working with Lynch on Twin Peaks due to the strength of their prior collaborations, and considers the director a personal friend, even describing their relationship, "David Lynch plucked me from obscurity. He cast me as the lead in Dune and Blue Velvet, and people have seen me as this boy-next-door-cooking-up-something-weird-in-the-basement ever since." MacLachlan earned several award nominations through these collaborative efforts, including two Primetime Emmy Award for Outstanding Lead Actor in a Drama Series nominations, and a successful Golden Globe Award for Best Actor in a Television Drama.

Actress Sheryl Lee was first cast as the deceased character Laura Palmer in Twin Peaks. However, Lynch soon asked her to play the second role of Madeline Ferguson throughout the series; Lee would reprise her role as Palmer in the series' feature-film sequel Twin Peaks: Fire Walk with Me, and made a brief appearance in Wild at Heart, which was filmed concurrently with Twin Peaks. Wild at Heart featured several other Twin Peaks alumni, including Grace Zabriskie, David Patrick Kelly and Jack Nance.

Crew

Lynch repeatedly uses certain crewmembers on his films, so much that they have been called his "Lynch mob". He has worked with Angelo Badalamenti on a large number of projects, having first collaborated with the composer on Blue Velvet in 1986. Lynch and Badalamenti also worked to write and produce two albums for singer Julee Cruise, penning music for 1989's Floating into the Night. and 1993's The Voice of Love. Cruise also joined the pair in crafting the music for Blue Velvet, Twin Peaks and Industrial Symphony No. 1.

Casting director Johanna Ray has worked with Lynch on multiple projects, beginning with Blue Velvet and continuing through the majority of Lynch's feature films, missing only The Straight Story. Ray's son Eric Da Re was also involved in Twin Peaks, as an actor. Lynch also worked with sound designer Alan Splet several times until the latter's death in 1994.

Lynch has worked with cinematographers Frederick Elmes and Freddie Francis on several occasions, employing both at once on Dune. Lynch and Elmes began collaborating while attending the AFI Conservatory, producing The Amputee and Eraserhead together while studying there. Fancis first worked with the director on The Elephant Man, later acting as cinematographer for Dune and The Straight Story. Peter Deming has also become director of photography in several of Lynch's productions, first on the television series On the Air, before making his first feature film work with Lynch on Lost Highway.

Footnotes

References

 
 
 
 

Collaborators
Lists of entertainers
Lynch,David